Samas may refer to
 Šamaš, the Semitic Sun god
 Samāsa "compound" in Sanskrit grammar, see Sanskrit compound